Erode Junction railway station (Station Code: ED) is the main railway junction serving the city of Erode, Tamil Nadu. Erode Junction is one of the major railway Junction in Southern Railway and is located 3 km away from Erode Central Bus Terminus. There is an ISO certified diesel locomotive shed and an electric loco shed attached with Erode Junction.

History
The station was established in 1862 and was connected by the first electrified broad-gauge link from Chennai Central.

During Under the rule of British India ,A New line, gauge unspecified, is shown as proposed and construction from Erode to Nanjangud via Satyamangalam, Killegal and Chamrajanagar, to link up with Bangalore. But it hadn't been materialized.

A recent survey has been undertaken in 2007 for the proposed 91.5 km section of Erode–Palani line project.

Facilities
The Junction has 4 platforms for handling passenger trains. The Junction serves as the hub for water filling facilities, food provision and cleaning of long-distance trains. The station has police station, bookshops, restaurants, accommodation facilities, ATMs, toilets and drinking water facility. There are passenger operated inquiry terminals and touch-screen kiosks. The station has split-flap timing boards, electronic display boards and plasma TVs that mention train timings and platform numbers. There is a stand-alone passenger reservation center that functions adjacent to the Junction

Lines

Locomotive sheds

Erode Junction loco shed is one among the very few stations in India which houses both diesel and electrical locomotives. Erode loco shed currently houses 350 electric and diesel locomotives, making it one of the largest loco sheds operated by Indian Railways. The ISO certified electric locomotive shed houses WAP-4, WAG-7 and WAP-7 Locomotives. The diesel loco shed set up in 1962, houses over 120 WDM-2 and WDM-3A, 11 WDP-4D, 11 WDG-4 (only GT46ACe wide cab versus) diesel locomotives. The trains passing through Erode junction often have a long technical halt in order to carry out engine swapping and maintenance checks.

References

External links 

Railway junction stations in Tamil Nadu
Railway stations in Erode district
Salem railway division
Railway stations in India opened in 1947
Transport in Erode